Uno Rush is an Xbox Live Arcade game based on the Uno card game. The game was expected to be released alongside the New Xbox Experience, showcasing the games functionality of the Xbox 360 Avatars, but was delayed for various reasons. Uno Rush was released on March 25, 2009 as part of Xbox Live's "Days of Arcade" promotion.

See also
Uno (video game)

References

Uno (card game) video games
2009 video games
Microsoft games
Video games developed in the United States
Xbox 360 games
Xbox 360 Live Arcade games
Xbox 360-only games
Multiplayer and single-player video games
Carbonated Games games